Cherry Jones (born November 21, 1956) is an American actress. Having started her career in theatre as a founding member of the American Repertory Theatre in 1980, she then transitioned into film and television. Celebrated for her dynamic roles on stage and screen, she has received various accolades including three Primetime Emmy Awards, and two Tony Awards as well as nominations for a Olivier Award, and Screen Actors Guild Award.

Jones made her Broadway debut in the 1987 play Stepping Out. She went on to received two Tony Awards for Best Actress in a Play for The Heiress in 1995 and Doubt in 2005. Her other Tony-nominated roles were in Our Country's Good in 1991, A Moon for the Misbegotten in 2000, and The Glass Menagerie in 2014. Her most recent Broadway performance was in The Lifespan of a Fact in 2018.

She is also known for her work on television with breakthrough roles as Barbara Layton in The West Wing and President Allison Taylor in 24 the latter of which won her the Primetime Emmy Award for Outstanding Supporting Actress in a Drama Series in 2009. She received a Screen Actors Guild Award nomination for Transparent in 2015 and earned two Primetime Emmy Awards Outstanding Guest Actress in a Drama Series for her roles in the Hulu drama series The Handmaid's Tale in 2019 and the HBO drama series Succession in 2020. 

Her film appearances include The Horse Whisperer (1998), Erin Brockovich (2000), Signs (2002), The Village (2004), Amelia (2009), The Beaver (2011), A Rainy Day in New York (2019), and The Eyes of Tammy Faye (2021).

Early life
Jones was born in Paris, Tennessee.  Her mother was a high school teacher, and her father owned a flower shop. Her parents were very supportive of her theatrical ambitions, encouraging her interest by sending her to classes with local drama teacher, Ruby Krider. Jones takes great pains to credit her high school speech teacher, Linda Wilson, with her first real preparatory work.  She is a 1978 graduate of the Carnegie Mellon School of Drama. While at CMU, she was one of the earliest actors to work at City Theatre, a fixture of Pittsburgh theatre.

Career
Most of her career has been in theater, beginning in 1980 as a founding member of the American Repertory Theater in Cambridge, Massachusetts.

Her Broadway performances include Lincoln Center's 1995 production of The Heiress and also a 2005 production of John Patrick Shanley's play Doubt at the Walter Kerr Theatre. For both roles, she earned a Tony Award for Best Leading Actress in a Play.

Other Broadway credits include Nora Ephron's play Imaginary Friends (with Swoosie Kurtz), the 2000 revival of A Moon for the Misbegotten, and Timberlake Wertenbaker's Our Country's Good, for which she earned her first Tony nomination. She is considered to be one of the foremost theater actresses in the United States. In 1994, she also appeared in the Broadway run of Angels in America: Millennium Approaches and Perestroika as the Angel, replacing Ellen McLaughlin, who had originated the role.

She has narrated the audiobook adaptations of Laura Ingalls Wilder's Little House  series including, Little House in the Big Woods, Little House on the Prairie, Farmer Boy, On the Banks of Plum Creek, By the Shores of Silver Lake, The Long Winter, and Little Town on the Prairie. In recent years, Jones has ventured into feature films. Her screen credits include Cradle Will Rock, The Perfect Storm, Signs, Ocean's Twelve, and The Village.

Jones played President Taylor on the Fox series 24, a role for which she won an Emmy for Outstanding Supporting Actress in a Drama Series. She played the role in the seventh season, from January to May 2009, as well as eighth season, which aired from January to May 2010.

In 2012, Jones starred in the NBC drama series Awake as psychiatrist Dr. Judith Evans.

Also in 2012, she portrayed Amanda Wingfield in the Loeb Drama Center's revival of Tennessee Williams' The Glass Menagerie alongside Zachary Quinto, Brian J. Smith and Celia Keenan-Bolger.

In 2014, Cherry Jones was inducted into the American Theater Hall of Fame.

In 2015 and 2016 Jones had a recurring role on the Primetime Emmy Award-winning Amazon comedy-drama series Transparent in its second and third seasons. She was nominated for the Critics' Choice Television Award for Best Guest Performer in a Comedy Series for her work in the 2015 season.

In 2016, she appeared in "Nosedive", an episode of the anthology series Black Mirror.

In 2018, Jones played Holly, the feminist mother to June/Offred in The Handmaid's Tale. She won an Emmy for her performance.

In 2019, Jones played the role of a grouchy psychic and tarot card reader in the comedy Wine Country, directed by Amy Poehler.

Personal life
In 1995, when Jones accepted her first Tony Award, she thanked her then-partner, architect Mary O'Connor, with whom she had an 18-year relationship.

She started dating actress Sarah Paulson in 2004. When she accepted her Best Actress Tony in 2005 for her work in Doubt, she thanked "Laura Wingfield", the Glass Menagerie character being played in the Broadway revival by Paulson. In 2007, Paulson and Jones declared their love for each other in an interview with Velvetpark at Women's Event 10 for the LGBT Center of New York. Paulson and Jones ended their relationship amicably in 2009.

In mid-2015, Jones married filmmaker Sophie Huber.

Filmography

Film

Television

Theatre

Awards and nominations

References

External links

 
 
 Cherry Jones at the Internet Off-Broadway Database
 Cast Out: Queer Lives in Theater (U. Michigan Press, edited by Robin Bernstein) republishes the interview in which Cherry Jones first publicly discussed her sexuality.
 Cherry Jones – Downstage Center interview at American Theatre Wing.org
 TonyAwards.com Interview with Cherry Jones

1956 births
Living people
American film actresses
American stage actresses
American television actresses
Audiobook narrators
Carnegie Mellon University College of Fine Arts alumni
Drama Desk Award winners
Outstanding Performance by a Supporting Actress in a Drama Series Primetime Emmy Award winners
American lesbian actresses
People from Paris, Tennessee
Tony Award winners
American LGBT rights activists
20th-century American actresses
21st-century American actresses
Actresses from Tennessee
LGBT people from Tennessee
American musical theatre actresses